Dan O'Brien (27 October 1884 – 26 June 1917) was an  Australian rules footballer who played with St Kilda in the Victorian Football League (VFL).

Notes

External links 

1884 births
1917 deaths
Australian rules footballers from Victoria (Australia)
St Kilda Football Club players